Jan Saxl (5 June 1948 – 2 May 2020) was a Czech-British mathematician, and a professor at the University of Cambridge.  He was known for his work in finite group theory, particularly on consequences of the classification of finite simple groups.

Education and career
Saxl was born in Brno, in what was at the time Czechoslovakia.  He came to the United Kingdom in 1968, during the Prague Spring.  
After undergraduate studies at the University of Bristol, he completed his DPhil in 1973 at the University of Oxford under the direction of Peter M. Neumann, with the title of Multiply Transitive Permutation Groups.

Saxl held postdoctoral positions at Oxford and the University of Illinois at Chicago, and a lecturer position at the University of Glasgow.  He moved to the University of Cambridge in 1976, and spent the rest of his career there.  He was elected as a fellow of Gonville and Caius College in 1986, and he retired in 2015.

Saxl published around 100 papers, and according to MathSciNet, these have been cited over 1900 times.  He is noted for his work in finite group theory, particularly on permutation groups, and often coauthored with Robert Guralnick, Martin Liebeck, and Cheryl Praeger.  Some notable and highly-cited examples of this work are as follows.  Liebeck, Saxl and Praeger gave a relatively simple and self-contained proof of the O'Nan–Scott theorem.  It had long been known that every maximal subgroup of a symmetric group or alternating group was intransitive, imprimitive, or primitive, and the same authors in 1988 gave a partial description of which primitive subgroups could occur.

Personal life
Saxl was married to Cambridge mathematician Ruth M. Williams and they had one daughter, Miriam.

Death
Saxl died on 2 May 2020, after a long period of poor health.

Awards and honors
A three-day conference in the joint honor of Saxl and Martin Liebeck was held at the University of Cambridge in July 2015.

Publications

Books

 

 
 
 

Selected articles

References

1948 births
2020 deaths
Scientists from Brno
Czech mathematicians
Group theorists
Alumni of the University of Oxford
Cambridge mathematicians
Fellows of Gonville and Caius College, Cambridge
University of Illinois Chicago people
Czech emigrants to the United Kingdom
Alumni of the University of Bristol